Tamayo Museum could refer to one of two museums in Mexico:

Museo Tamayo de Arte Contemporáneo, in Mexico City
Museo Rufino Tamayo, Oaxaca